Maniac (from Greek μανιακός, maniakos) is a pejorative for an individual who experiences the mood known as mania.  In common usage, it is also an insult for someone involved in reckless behavior.

Maniac may also refer to:

Film 
Maniac (1934 film), an exploitation film directed by Dwain Esper
Maniac (1963 film), directed by Michael Carreras
The Ransom (aka Maniac!), 1977 film with Oliver Reed
Maniac (1980 film), directed by William Lustig
Maniac (2011 film), directed by Shia LaBeouf
Maniac (2012 film), a remake of the 1980 film

Literature 

 Maniac, a 1995 novel by John Peel

Television
Maniac (Norwegian TV series), a Norwegian television series
Maniac (miniseries), an American TV series based on the Norwegian series

Medicine
Melanocytic nevus with intraepidermal ascent of cells

Games
Ideal Maniac, a handheld electronic LED game created by the Ideal Toy Company

Music
Maniac (producer), grime producer from London
Stage name of Norwegian musician Sven Erik Kristiansen
Maniac (band), a band from Los Angeles, California, US

Songs
"Maniac" (Michael Sembello song), used in the 1983 film Flashdance
"Maniac" (Girlicious song), a 2010 song
"Maniac" (Conan Gray song), a 2019 song
"Maniac" (Stray Kids song), a 2022 song
"Maniac", by Clap Your Hands Say Yeah from their album Hysterical
"Maniac", by Kid Cudi from his album Man on the Moon II: The Legend of Mr. Rager
"Maniac", by Jhené Aiko
"Maniac", by Merrill Nisker from her album Fancypants Hoodlum
"Maniac", by Caravan Palace from their album Panic
"Maniac", by Carpenter Brut featuring Yann Ligner

Sports 
 Maryland Maniacs, a United States indoor football team
 "Maniac" Mike Davis (1956–2001), American professional wrestler
 "Maniac" Jimmy Deo, a professional wrestler; one half of the tag-team Assault and Battery
 The Maniacs, Ultras group of FK Željezničar Sarajevo
 Shaquille Leonard (born 1995), American football player

Other
MANIAC I, an early computer

See also
Manniac, a 2005 film directed by Ingo Trendelbernd
Mania (disambiguation)
Maniacal (disambiguation)
Manic (disambiguation)